The Odeske gas field natural gas field located on the continental shelf of the Black Sea. It was discovered in 2009 and developed by Chornomornaftogaz in cooperation with the China National Offshore Oil Corporation. It started commercial production on 5 September 2012.

References

Natural gas fields in Ukraine
Black Sea energy
Economy of Crimea
Chornomornaftogaz property